Ann Purmell (born November 15, 1953 in Ann Arbor, Michigan) is an American children's book author.

Her first book, Apple Cider-Making Days was published in 2003 and was followed by Where Wild Babies Sleep in 2003. Her next book Christmas Tree Farm won the 2007 Ohio Farm Bureau Federation's Children's Literature Award. The award goes to children's books with an agricultural subject. Her 2008 Maple Syrup Season continued with her agricultural themes.

Purmell was a psychiatric nurse for children, having received her nursing degree from Eastern Michigan University in 1979. Purmell is married to a dentist and has two children.

References

External links

Judyth Piazza chats with Ann Purmell, Author of The Christmas Tree Farm theSOP

1953 births
Living people
Eastern Michigan University alumni
American children's writers
American women children's writers
21st-century American women